"A Thing About You" is a song by Swedish pop music duo Roxette, released on 14 October 2002 as the lead single from the duo's second greatest hits compilation album, The Ballad Hits (2002). Their first release following vocalist Marie Fredriksson's brain tumour diagnosis, the song charted in the top forty of numerous national record charts, including Austria, Belgium, Brazil, Germany, Italy, Spain, Sweden, Switzerland and Taiwan. The song received moderate airplay in the United Kingdom via BBC Radio 2, and remains their last single to enter the UK Singles Chart, peaking at number 77. Its music video was directed by longtime collaborator Jonas Åkerlund.

Formats and track listings
All songs written by Per Gessle.

 CD Single (Europe 5515060)
 "A Thing About You" – 3:51
 "The Weight of the World" – 2:52
 "A Thing About You"  – 3:43

Personnel
Credits adapted from the liner notes of The Ballad Hits.

 Recorded at Tits & Ass Studio, Halmstad in December 2001 and Polar Studios, Stockholm in March and June 2002.
 Mixed by Ronny Lahti, Clarence Öfwerman and Per Gessle at Polar Studios, Stockholm in June 2002.

Musicians
 Per Gessle – lead and background vocals, acoustic guitar and production
 Marie Fredriksson – background vocals
 Milla Andersson – background vocals
 Jonas Isacsson – electric guitar
 Ronny Lahti – engineering
 Christoffer Lundquist – background vocals and bass guitar
 Clarence Öfwerman – programming and production
 Mats "MP" Persson – engineering
 Shooting Star – programming

Charts

References

2002 singles
Music videos directed by Jonas Åkerlund
Roxette songs
Songs written by Per Gessle
2002 songs
EMI Records singles